Leonard Rosmarin (born in Montreal, Quebec) is a Canadian professor of French literature and a novelist. He is the former Chair of the Department of Modern Languages at Brock University in St. Catharines, Ontario.

Rosmarin is a specialist of seventeenth century French literature, and links between opera and literature.

Biography 

Rosmarin earned a doctorate from Yale University where he began his teaching career in 1964. He became assistant professor at Wesleyan University, also in Connecticut.

In 1969, he returned to Canada to take up a position as associate, then full professor at Brock University.

Rosmarin has been decorated twice by the Government of France for distinguished service in the cause of French letters.

Books 

 Elie Wiesel ou le refus du désespoir, Editions du Grand-Pré, 2011 (book never published: publisher went bankrupt)
 Getting Enough, Strategic Book Publishing, 2009, 
 Liliane Atlan ou la quête de la forme divine, L'Harmattan : Editions du Gref, 2004
 When Literature becomes Opera : Study of a Transformational Process, Rodopi Bv Editions, 1999, 
 Robert Pinget, Twayne publishers, 1995, 
 Exilés, marginaux et parias dans les littératures francophones, L'Harmattan : Editions du Gref, 1994
 Albert Cohen, témoin d'un peuple, Editions du Grand-Pré, 1992
 Emmanuel Levinas, humaniste de l'autre homme, L'Harmattan : Editions du Gref, 1991, 
 Saint-Evremond, artiste de l'euphorie, Summa publications, 1987,

References 

Canadian male novelists
Living people
Academic staff of Brock University
Canadian non-fiction writers in French
Writers from Montreal
20th-century Canadian novelists
21st-century Canadian novelists
20th-century Canadian male writers
21st-century Canadian male writers
Year of birth missing (living people)
Canadian novelists in French